R.L.P. Verma (1 February 1938 – 15 January 2004) was a former member of Lok Sabha and a leader of Bhartiya Janata Party. He was elected to Lok Sabha from Kodarma in Jharkhand state in India for five terms.
He was born to an agrarian family belonging to kushwaha(Koeri) caste.

He is known to be the first MLA of Bihar Legislative Assembly to resign on the call of JP Narayan during JP Movement. He also worked hard to establish a rail connection between Giridih and Koderma districts of Jharkhand.

He is also known to pave the way of BJP in Bihar and Jharkhand.

His son Pranav Verma also fought Lok Sabha election but lost to Ravindra Rai in Modi wave. His brother Jagdish Prasad Kushwaha is known as Bhismpitamah of BJP in Bihar and Jharkhand. Recently the Giridih Municipal Corporation decided to honor him posthumously by naming the Junction of Jila parishad as Rati Lal Prasad Verma Chowk.

He was one of the two Member of Parliament of BJP during transformation of Jana Sangh into Bhartiya Janata Party.

References 

 

People from Kodarma
1938 births
2004 deaths
India MPs 1977–1979
India MPs 1980–1984
India MPs 1989–1991
India MPs 1996–1997
India MPs 1998–1999
Lok Sabha members from Bihar
Bharatiya Janata Party politicians from Jharkhand
Janata Party politicians
Bharatiya Lok Dal politicians